Hind Mohammed is a Saudi Arabian actress. She co-starred in Rotana's comedy-drama film Keif al-Hal?, the country's first big-budget film, produced by Ayman Halawani.

Career
Ayman Halawani told the BBC in May 2006 that the film is potentially significant in charting the developing role of women in Saudi Arabia:
"Hind was brave in taking on the role of Dunya. She’s shown that a Saudi actress can both be attractive and dignified."

The part involved Hind playing a woman who was struggling with her particularly conservative family, a topical issue both within and outside of the Arab world.

References

External links
 

Saudi Arabian film actresses
People from Riyadh
Living people
1981 births